John Wristen (born April 15, 1962) is a former American football coach and player. He was the head football coach at Colorado State University–Pueblo (CSU Pueblo), a position he held from 2008 until his retirement in 2022. He graduated from CSU Pueblo in 1984, when the school was known as the University of Southern Colorado. Wristen led the 2014 CSU Pueblo ThunderWolves football team to the NCAA Division II Football Championship title.

Head coaching record

References

External links
 CSU Pueblo profile
 UCLA profile
 Colorado profile

1962 births
Living people
American football quarterbacks
Colorado Buffaloes football coaches
CSU Pueblo ThunderWolves football coaches
CSU Pueblo ThunderWolves football players
Northwestern Wildcats football coaches
UCLA Bruins football coaches
Players of American football from Denver